Edgar Zilsel (August 11, 1891, Vienna, Austria-Hungary – March 11, 1944, Oakland, California) was an Austrian-American historian and a philosopher of science. 

He is known for his Zilsel Thesis, a scientific proposal which traces the origins of western science to the interactions between scholars and skilled artisans, which melded practical experimentation with analytical thought. As part of the left wing of the Vienna Circle, a group of early twentieth-century philosophers, he endorsed historical materialism and sought to establish empirical laws in history and in society.

He was also a Jewish Marxist, which rendered him unable to pursue an academic career in Austria. Fleeing persecution, he escaped to the United States where he received a Rockefeller Fellowship Membership. During this time, he published many papers, including Sociological Roots of Modern Science. In 1943, he was invited to teach physics at Mills College in California.  

Zilsel committed suicide on March 11, 1944.

Life
Edgar Zilsel was the youngest child of Jacob Zilsel, a lawyer, and Ina Kollmer. He had two older sisters, Wallie Zilsel and Irma Zilsel. He attended high school at the Franz-Joseph-Gymnasium between 1902 and 1910 and then attended the University of Vienna where he studied philosophy, physics, and mathematics. In 1914, He also served in the military for four months and in 1915, he received his PhD while under the supervision of Heinrich Gomperz. His dissertation was entitled  "A Philosophical Investigation of the Law of Large Numbers and related Laws". After working as a mathematician at an insurance company for a few months, he found a position as a teacher on February 16, 1917. He passed his teacher's examination on November 18, 1918 in mathematics, physics, and natural history.

Although linked to the Vienna Circle, Zilsel critiqued the views of Circle members. He participated actively in working people's education, teaching philosophy and physics at the Vienna People's University.

Following the defeat of the Austrian Social Democratic Party in the Austrian Civil War in 1934, Zilsel was arrested. Although only detained briefly, he was dismissed from his job. He then taught mathematics and physics at a secondary school (Mittelschule) in Vienna.

As a philosopher, he combined Marxist views with the logical positivism of the Vienna Circle. He regularly published articles in academic and socialist journals. An extended version of his PhD thesis was published as a book (The Application Problem: a Philosophical Investigation of the Law of Large Numbers and its Induction). Two other books, The Religion of Genius:  A Critical Study of the Modern Ideal of Personality and The Development of the Concept of Genius: a Contribution to the Conceptual History of Antiquity and Early Capitalism were published in 1918 and 1926, respectively.

Zilsel managed to escape from Austria after the Anschluss, first to England and in 1939 to the United States where he received a Rockefeller Fellowship enabling him to devote time to research. He published many papers during these years of exile, including Sociological Roots of Modern Science. In 1943, he was invited by Lynn White to teach physics at Mills College in California, but shortly thereafter committed suicide with an overdose of sleeping pills.

Thought
Zilsel proposed the Zilsel Thesis as an explanation for the rise of Western science. Zilsel claimed that the rise of capitalism led to the interaction of craftspeople with scholars. This interaction in turn led to the beginnings of early modern science. The craftspeople had been for the most part illiterate and looked down upon by the educated classes. The scholars were ignorant of practical craft activity. The intellectual theorizing of the crafts and the absorption of craft knowledge into the investigation of nature led to the development of experimental science.

Another of Zilsel's theories was that the rise of the notion of laws of nature in early modern science was a product of the generalization of the juridical concept of law to natural phenomena. Just as the king lays down the legal laws for the nation, God lays down the laws of nature for the universe.

Zilsel's ideas were used by historian of Chinese science Joseph Needham to account for the lack of experimental science in traditional China, despite the Chinese being in advance of the West in both technology and in many areas of natural history observation.

Zilsel has been praised by historian Clifford D. Conner  for having been the first to stress the role of artisans and craftsmen in the development of modern science. According to Conner, the theses of Zilsel were met with resistance at the time of their publication, also due to the author's early death, and his works were later revalued by historians such as Pamela H. Smith.

References

Bibliography
Johann Dvorak, Edgar Zilsel, Wissenschaft und Volksbildung. In: Erwachsenenbildung in Österreich. Fachzeitschrift für Mitarbeiter in der Erwachsenenbildung, 45. Jg., 1994, H. 3, S. 7-14.
J. Dvorak, Edgar Zilsel und die Einheit der Erkenntnis (Vienna: Löcker Verlag, 1981).
Pamela O. Long, Artisan/Practitioners and the Rise of the New Sciences, 1400-1600 (Corvallis, OR: Oregon State University Press, 2011), 11–15.
Edgar Zilsel, The Social Origins of Modern Science. eds. Diederick Raven, Wolfgang Krohn, and Robert S. Cohen (Dordrecht: Kluwer Academic Publishers, 2000); .

External links

 "Portrait Of My Father" by Paul Zilsel, (in the journal Schmate, Volume 1, Issue 1, April/May 1982)

 Biography (with photo), adulteducation.at; accessed August 26, 2016.

Historians of science
Vienna Circle
Burials at the Vienna Central Cemetery
Austrian Jews
Jewish emigrants from Austria to the United States after the Anschluss
Writers from Vienna
1891 births
1944 suicides
Drug-related suicides in California
Austro-Hungarian military personnel of World War I